Staudenmaier is a surname. Notable people with the surname include:

Franz Anton Staudenmaier (1800–1856), German Catholic theologian
Louis W. Staudenmaier (1906–1980), American lawyer, businessman, and politician